Chris Bey (born February 13, 1996) is an American professional wrestler currently signed with Impact Wrestling, where he is a former one-time X Division Champion and current one-time World Tag Team Champion. He is also known for his work on the independent scene. He has also made appearances for New Japan Pro-Wrestling, where he is a current member of Bullet Club.

Professional wrestling career

Independent circuit (2017–2021)
In late 2017, Bey would start wrestling for PCW Ultra and in his debut match, he defeated Adrian Quest. Then a month later on October 6, he would defeat Hammerstone before going on a three-match losing streak in the promotion. During his brief losing streak, Bey would lose to the likes of Jake Atlas and A. C. H.

Impact Wrestling

Early beginnings (2018–2019) 
On the November 29, 2018, episode of Impact!, Bey made his first Impact Wrestling appearance when he teamed with Mike Sydal, as both unsuccessfully challenged The Rascalz (Dezmond Xavier and Zachary Wentz) Before officially signing with Impact on February 19, 2020, Bey made couple more appearances during the late 2018 and 2019 where he would face the likes of Luchasaurus, Peter Avalon, Daga and Jake Crist . On the March 17 episode of Impact!, Bey had his first victory on Impact Wrestling, when he defeated Damian Drake.

X Division Champion (2020–2021) 
During the second night of Rebellion, which aired on April 28, Bey defeated Rohit Raju, Suicide and Trey in his Impact pay-per-view debut, establishing himself as an X Division performer.  Bey received his first Impact X Division Championship match on the May 5 episode of Impact!, where he and Ace Austin unsuccessfully challenged the X Division Champion Willie Mack in a three-way match. After Mack successfully retained his championship against Johnny Swinger on the May 19 episode of Impact!, Bey attacked Mack along with Swinger, solidifying himself as a heel in the process. On June 25, Impact announced that Bey will challenged Mack for the X Division Championship on Slammiversary, after he pinned Mack in a six-man tag team match. At the Slammiversary, Bey defeated Mack to win the X Division Championship. On the August 18 episode of Impact's Emergence - Night 1, Bey lost the championship to Rohit Raju in a three-way match that also involved TJP, thus ending his reign at only 31 days. After losing the X Division title, Bey quietly moved towards the main event scene where he competed for the Impact World Championship. On December 12 at Final Resolution, Bey lost to champion Rich Swann in his first world title opportunity.

Bullet Club (2021–present)
Bey competed in an Ultimate X Match for the X-Division at the Slammiversary 2021, but the match was won by Josh Alexander. Backstage after the match, Bey found a Bullet Club shirt on his chair in the locker room, teasing him joining the group. The following week, the newly debuted Jay White questioned if Bey had accepted his offer to join Bullet Club, though Bey initially declined, White told him to think about the offer. On the July 29th episode of Impact, White and Bey teamed for the first time losing to Impact World Tag Team Champions Doc Gallows and Karl Anderson. The following week, Bey defeated Juice Robinson and officially joined Bullet Club after the match.

On the March 2 2023 episode of Impact, Bey along with Ace Austin defeated The Motor City Machine Guns to win the Impact World Tag Team Championship for the first time in his career.

WWE (2019) 
Bey made his WWE debut on the October 11, 2019, episode of 205 Live where he lost to Ariya Daivari.

Ring of Honor (2019) 
Bey made his Ring of Honor (ROH) debut on the March 16, 2019 tapings of ROH TV where he defeated Damian Drake in a dark match. His next appearance was another dark match on September 28 at Death Before Dishonor XVII, where teamed up with Slice Boogie in a losing effort against Josh Woods and Silas Young.

New Japan Pro-Wrestling (2020–present) 
On November 2, 2020, Bey was announced for New Japan Pro-Wrestling's Super J-Cup tournament. On December 12, Bey defeated Clark Connors in the first round of the tournament but ultimately failed to defeat eventual runner up A. C. H. in the semifinals.

On September 25, 2021, Bey, El Phantasmo, Taiji Ishimori, and Hikuleo would team up as the Bullet Club for the first time collectively as they defeated Clark Connors, Lio Rush, TJP, and Juice Robinson. The next day, Bey would take his first NJPW loss since joining Bullet Club when he and El Phantasmo lost to Chris Dickinson and former Bullet Club member Robbie Eagles.

Championships and accomplishments 
All Pro Wrestling / Gold Rush Pro Wrestling
Young Lions Cup (2017)
APW Junior Heavyweight Championship (1 time, current)
Championship Wrestling from Hollywood
UWN Tag Team Championship (1 time) – with Suede Thompson
Future Stars of Wrestling
FSW Heavyweight Championship (1 time)
FSW Mecca Grand Championship (1 time, current)
FSW No Limits Championship (2 times)
FSW Tag Team Championship (2 times) – with Nino Black (1) and Suede Thompson (1)
Impact Wrestling
Impact World Tag Team Championship (1 time) - with Ace Austin
Impact X Division Championship (1 time)
Impact Year End Awards (1 time)
One to Watch in 2021	(2020)
Maverick Pro Wrestling
Maverick Pro Heavyweight Championship (1 time)
Maverick Revolution Championship (1 time)
Pro Wrestling Illustrated
Ranked No. 94 of the top 500 singles wrestlers in the PWI 500 in 2021
The  Wrestling Revolver
Revolver Championship (1 time)
PWR Tag Team Championship (1 time, current) - with Ace Austin
Without a Cause
WAC Championship (1 time)
Wrestlings Best of the West
BOTW Championship (1 time)

References

External links

1996 births
21st-century African-American sportspeople
21st-century professional wrestlers
African-American male professional wrestlers
American male professional wrestlers
Bullet Club members
Living people
Professional wrestlers from Virginia
TNA/Impact X Division Champions
TNA/Impact World Tag Team Champions